Hanan Porat (5 December 1943 – 4 October 2011) was an Israeli Orthodox rabbi, educator, and politician who served as a member of the Knesset for Tehiya, the National Religious Party, Tkuma, and the National Union between 1981 and 1984, and between 1988 and 1999.

Biography
Hanan Spitzer (later Porat) was born in Kfar Pines during the Mandate era. In 1944, his family moved to Kfar Etzion. In early 1948, during the Arab riots of 1948, Kfar Etzion was besieged, and the children were evacuated to Jerusalem. Porat's father also moved there to arrange convoys. After the Kfar Etzion massacre, his family settled in Kfar Pines. Porat studied at the Bnei Akiva yeshiva high school, Yeshivat Kerem B'Yavneh, and the Mercaz HaRav talmudic college, and was ordained as a rabbi. He worked as a religious teacher at several yeshivas.

He is one of the main characters featured in Yossi Klein HaLevi's Like Dreamers: The Story of the Israeli Paratroopers who Reunited Jerusalem and Divided A Nation. He served in Israel's 55th Paratroopers Brigade during the Six-Day War, and was among the troops that captured the Temple Mount and conquered East Jerusalem. During this euphoric moment in Israel's history, he is quoted as saying, "We are writing the next chapter of the Bible." He later said that the Israeli victory should have become a national holiday. After the Six-Day War, he helped re-establish the Gush Etzion settlement bloc in the West Bank. He convinced Prime Minister Levi Eshkol to grant permission to settle in Gush Etzion. He first re-established the community of Kfar Etzion. Then, together with Rav Yoel Bin-Nun, he founded Yeshivat Har Etzion and the community of Alon Shevut. They recruited Rav Yehuda Amital to head the new Yeshiva, and a couple years later, Rav Aharon Lichtenstein would come on Aliyah to co-head the Yeshiva alongside Amital.

Porat was badly wounded in the Yom Kippur War of 1973 on the bank of the Suez canal. He recovered, and was amongst the founders of the Gush Emunim movement, which founded over 100 Israeli settlements. In 1975, he led the founding of Elon Moreh, the first Israeli settlement in the West Bank, in Sebastia.

Porat died on 4 October 2011, aged 67, of cancer. He was survived by his wife, 10 children, and 20 grandchildren.

Political career
In the 1981 elections, he was voted into the Knesset on the Tehiya list. He resigned on 7 March 1984, towards the end of the Knesset term, and was replaced by Zvi Shiloah. After the evacuation of Yamit in 1982, he announced his intention to build new settlements in parts of the Land of Israel still not in Israeli hands. In 1995, he convinced Prime Minister Yitzhak Rabin not to hand over Rachel's Tomb to the Palestinian Authority. He tried to repeat that in 2008. Prior to Israel's disengagement from Gaza, he instructed youngsters in Neve Dekalim in Gush Katif to disrupt evacuation forces.

In 1988, he returned to the Knesset, this time as a member of the National Religious Party. He was re-elected in 1992 and 1996. In 1996, he was appointed the NRP's parliamentary group chairman, but on 4 March 1999, he and Zvi Hendel left the party to establish a new faction, initially named Emunim, later renamed Tkuma.

Prior to the 1999 elections, Tkuma formed an alliance with other small right-wing parties, named the National Union. Porat was placed third on the Union's list, and was re-elected again. However, he resigned from the Knesset on 20 October that year, and was replaced by Hendel.

Published works
Et Ahai Anohi Mevakesh (first published as Et Anat Anohi Mevakesh)
Me'at Min Ha'or
Recorded lectures on Arutz Meir (MeirTV) by Machon Meir

See also
Beit Orot
Yeshivat Har Etzion
Gush Emunim

References

Bibliography

External links

1943 births
2011 deaths
20th-century Israeli rabbis
21st-century Israeli rabbis
Israeli educators
Israeli Orthodox rabbis
Israeli soldiers
Mercaz HaRav alumni
Tehiya politicians
National Religious Party politicians
Religious Zionist Party leaders
National Union (Israel) politicians
Deaths from cancer in Israel
Members of the 10th Knesset (1981–1984)
Members of the 12th Knesset (1988–1992)
Members of the 13th Knesset (1992–1996)
Members of the 14th Knesset (1996–1999)
Members of the 15th Knesset (1999–2003)
Moskowitz Prize for Zionism laureates
Rabbinic members of the Knesset
Jewish Israeli politicians
Jewish military personnel
Yeshivat Har Etzion